Roya Arab (born 1967) is a Iranian born-British musician and archaeologist.

Musical career
Born in Tehran, Iran, Roya Arab learned the craft of singing during jam sessions around London in the early and mid-1990s. She was the first Iranian female to receive a publishing and recording deal from a major Western label, when she was signed as a member of Archive to Island Records in 1994, and the album Londinium was released in 1996. The band broke up shortly after. Arab went on to work with various artists, including Leila in Like Weather, Grooverider in Mysteries of Funk, followed by some work in Paris with Zend Avesta and Naab, before working on a project with Mike Figgis. Courtesy of Choice (2000) by Leila was the last album Arab appeared on before a hiatus to study archaeology.

In 2008 Arab sang on Blood, Looms and Blooms, before joining Leila on a European tour in 2009. Arab started working with young Iranian musicians leaving Iran including Hichkas and Ash Koosha, and performing live again. In 2011 the live recording of ‘Killing fields’ with Hichkas was made available to the public. ‘Mooye Parishoon’ was released in 2013 for raising awareness of domestic violence and abuse. She appeared on Rosko John 's debut solo album Call to Arms. Arab started collaborating with Arshid Azarine in 2018 and recorded a song for his 2019 album. A collaboration with Rone appeared in 2021.

Education

Arab attended Maktabe Tarbiat school in Tehran, while also studying at summer schools in Montana, Switzerland, and St Georges in Ascot. After the 1979 revolution she boarded at Ancaster House School in Bexhill-on-Sea, before taking her A-levels at North Westminster Community School. She then completed one year of a copywriting/advertising course.

She joined the Institute of Archaeology (UCL) in 2000 to complete an Archaeology BA and Public Archaeology MA and remained as an Honorary Research Associate from 2008 until 2015. She is currently undertaking research into music in Iranian films and what it reveals about society’s attitudes to music and musicianship.  In 2020 she was made Associate Member of SMEI and CIS at SOAS, University of London.

Archiving, socio-political commentary and promoting cultures of the Middle East and North Africa
During and after Arab's studies in public archaeology at the UCL she has catalogued historical documents including the Wertime Collection and the Campbell archives.

Arab promotes the cultures of the MENA region with a special interest in Iran. She has worked with organisations and festivals such as Nour (RBKC) and the London Middle East Institute at SOAS, University of London to curate cultural and educational events celebrating the heritage of Middle East and North Africa. In 2019, Arab co-edited an issue of The Middle East in London covering Iranian cinema.

Selected discography
 2021: Rone, Rone & Friends, “Twenty 20” (Rone, R.Arab)
 2021: Faubourg, Rith Banney and Roya Arab ''Lost''
 2019: Arshid Azarine, Sing me a Song “Hidden Hell” (R.Arab & A.Azarine)
 2014: R. Arab, "Siren's call" film score for Hinterland, a short film by Sebastian Lister
 2014: Rosko John, Call to Arms: "March Forth" (Rosko John, R. Arab & M. Aghajani) 
 2013: Funkshy, Think before you do: “Funkshy’ (T.Omar & R.Arab) 
 2013: Hichkas, R. Arab & Dariush "Mooye Parishoon" (Hichkas, R. Arab, Dariush & Mahdyar Aghajani) 
 2012: Rosko John, "Tactical light" (Rosko John and R.Arab) 
 2011: R. Arab & Hichkas, "Killing Fields" live (R.Arab & Hichkas) 
 2008: Leila, Blood, Looms and Blooms: "Daisies, Cats and Spacemen" (R. Arab, L. Arab) 
 2000 & 2020: Zend Avesta, Organique: "À la Manière" (Roya Arab, Rebotini) 
 2000: Leila, Courtesy of Choice: "Different time" (R. Arab, L. Arab, G. Jones, Woolley)
 1999: Naab, L’étranger: "L’étranger" (R. Arab, Naab)
 1998 & 2020: Leila, Like Weather: "Blue Grace" (R. Arab, L. Arab)
 1998: Grooverider, Mysteries of Funk: "Rainbows of Colour" (Roya Arab, Grooverider, Optical)
 1996: Archive, Londinium (Island Records): "All Time", "So few Words", "Ubiquitous Wife" (a.k.a. "Headspace"), "Darkroom", "Londinium", "Nothing Else", "Parvaneh (Butterfly)", "Last Five", "Ubiquitous Wife Remix" (hidden song)

Selected publications
 Arab, R. 2019. “Parviz Sayyad: Socio-political commentator dressed as village fool” in The Middle East in London. Volume 15 – Number 2 February–March 2019
 Arab, R. 2017. “How Men Became the Sole Adult Dancing Singers in Iranian Films” in Music on Screen: From Cinema Screens to Touchscreens. Musicology Research (online) Autumn 2017, Vol. 3.
 Arab, R. 2016. "The changing use of music in Iranian films reflects a complex culture in flux". 30 April 2016 in www.mediadiversified.org.
 Arab, R. 2016. "Swaying to Persian and Middle Eastern tunes in London", The Middle East in London. Vol 12, No 2, February/March 2016: 19–20.
 Arab, R. 2015. "Can Composition and Performance be Research?" 25 November 2015. City University Blogspot.
 Arab, R. 2015. "Review and reflections on Culture in Crisis Conference V&A April 2015". 20 May 2015 in www.wikiarc.org
 Arab, R.  2014. "Campbell, John Nicholl Robert ii. The Archives", Encyclopædia Iranica.
 Arab, R. 2013, "Terror and I", 23 July 2013 in www.mediadiversified.org.
 Arab, R. & N.  Earl. 2011. "Persians, Classics and Secondary Education", The Journal of Classics Teaching, no. 24, Autumn 2011: 11–14.
 Arab, R. 2010. "Open letter on Iranian heritage". Public Archaeology, Vol 9, No 2: 108–120.
 Arab, R. 2009. "Comments and Reflections on ‘Archaeology in Conflict: Cultural heritage, site management and sustainable developments in conflict and post- conflict states in the Middle East" in www.wikiarc.org
 Arab, R.  2005. Student Guide Book for IHF educational programme in conjunction with the British Museum exhibition British Museum with Achaemenid assistance from S. Razmjou, edited by F. Hakimzadeh & R. Dwyer.
 Arab, R. & Rehren, Th. 2004. ‘The Wertime Pyrotechnological Expedition of 1968’, IAMS, Vol 24: 29–34.
 Arab. R & Rehren.Th 2004. "The pyrotechnological expedition of 1968". In: Th. Stöllner, R. Slotta and A. Vatandoust, eds), Persiens Antike Pracht, Bergbau Handwerk Archäogie, Deutsches Bergbau-Museum, Bochum: 550–555.

Reports
 2010. "An overview of ‘State terrorism and Libya’s record on human rights: fact of fiction? A Conference by Society Outreach", House of Lords, 27 January 2010.
 2009. "A report of the seminar for National Interfaith week" at the Zoroastrian Centre in London (ZTFE), 18 November 2009.
 2009. "Review and reflections on: Is the kingdom of Saudi Arabia prepared to defend Human Rights, Civil Liberties and Fight Terrorism". A Conference by Society Outreach, House of Lords, 7 December 2009.

References

External links
 Roya Arab personal website
 Roya Arab page at the Institute for Archaeo-Metallurgical Studies

Living people
Exiles of the Iranian Revolution in the United Kingdom
20th-century Iranian women singers
Musicians from Tehran
1967 births
British women archaeologists
Iranian women archaeologists
20th-century British women singers
21st-century British women singers